Mohammad Fahmi Al-Ayyubi (born December 21, 1995) is an Indonesian professional footballer who plays as a winger for Liga 1 club Dewa United.

Club career

Persela Lamongan
He made his professional debut in the Liga 1 on April 16, 2017 against PSM Makassar. Fahmi made his debut on 21 April 2017 in a match against Madura United. On 21 April 2017, Fahmi scored his first goal for Persela against Madura United in the 38th minute at the Surajaya Stadium, Lamongan.

Bali United
He was signed for Bali United to play in Liga 1 in the 2019 season. Fahmi made his debut on 16 May 2019 in a match against Persebaya Surabaya at the Kapten I Wayan Dipta Stadium, Gianyar. On 2 December 2019, Bali United won the championship for the first time in their history, becoming the seventh club to win the Liga 1 after second placed Borneo draw to PSM, followed by a win in Semen Padang, giving Bali United a 17-point lead with only four games left.

Persik Kediri (loan)
In 2022, Fahmi signed a contract with Indonesian Liga 1 club Persik Kediri, on loan from Bali United. He made his league debut on 8 January 2022 in a match against Borneo at the Kapten I Wayan Dipta Stadium, Gianyar.

Dewa United
On 3 June 2022, Al-Ayyubi signed a contract for Dewa United. He made his league debut on 25 July 2022 in a match against Persis Solo at the Moch. Soebroto Stadium, Magelang.

International career
In 2014, Fahmi represented the Indonesia U-19, in the 2014 AFF U-19 Youth Championship.

Career statistics

Club

Honours

Club
Bali United
 Liga 1: 2019

References

External links
 
 Fahmi Al-Ayyubi at Liga Indonesia

Living people
1995 births
People from Pasuruan
Sportspeople from East Java
Indonesian footballers
Persela Lamongan players
Bali United F.C. players
Persik Kediri players
Dewa United F.C. players
Liga 1 (Indonesia) players
Indonesia youth international footballers
Association football forwards